The Ukrainian Freedom Orchestra is an orchestra composed of Ukrainian refugees who have fled the Russian invasion of Ukraine and Ukrainian members of other European orchestras. Canadian conductor Keri-Lynn Wilson, who has Ukrainian ancestry, provided the impetus for the creation of the Ukrainian Freedom Orchestra, which the Metropolitan Opera of New York and the Polish National Opera immediately supported as a gesture of solidarity with the victims of the war in Ukraine.

History 
The 74 musicians, all Ukrainians – recent refugees, Ukrainian members from some European orchestras (e.g. Tonkünstler Orchestra, Belgian National Orchestra and Royal Concertgebouw Orchestra) and some of the top musicians of Kyiv, Lviv, Kharkiv, Odesa and elsewhere in Ukraine – assembled in Warsaw 10 days before the inaugural concert for intensive rehearsals. The inaugural concert was held in Warsaw on July 28 (2022) at the Polish National Opera. The programme of this concert included the 7th Symphony by the Ukrainian composer Valentyn Silvestrov, Frédéric Chopin’s Piano Concerto No. 2 (soloist: Anna Fedorova), Leonore's aria Abscheulicher! Wo eilst du hin? from Beethoven’s opera Fidelio (soloist: Liudmyla Monastyrska) and the 4th Symphony in E-minor by Johannes Brahms. On July 31 the Orchestra performed the same programme at the 2022 BBC Proms, a performance that was hailed by The Guardian as "highly impressive and deeply moving".

The Ukrainian Freedom Orchestra continued its world concert tour with concerts in the United Kingdom – Edinburgh (Edinburgh International Festival) and Snape (Snape Maltings, Suffolk), Germany – Munich (Isar Philharmonic Hall), Berlin (Konzerthaus) and Hamburg (Elbphilharmonie), France – Orange (Chorégies d'Orange Festival, Vaucluse), Netherlands – Amsterdam (Royal Concertgebouw Festival) and Ireland – Dublin (National Concert Hall). In European cultural capitals the orchestra was greeted with standing ovations and positive reviews from critics. The tour concluded with concerts in New York (Lincoln Center) on August 18 and 19, 2022 and in Washington DC (Kennedy Center) on August 20. The New York Times acclaimed the Lincoln Center performance as "admirably even-keeled and soft-spoken, an embodiment of a cultured nation".

References

Ukrainian orchestras
Musical groups established in 2022
Reactions to the 2022 Russian invasion of Ukraine